Kimoi Alexander (born November 13, 1985) is an Antiguan footballer who currently plays for Swetes FC in the USL Professional Division.

Career
Alexander made his professional debut for Barracuda on May 8, 2011 in a 1-0 win against River Plate Puerto Rico.

International
Alexander so far has made nine appearances for the Antigua and Barbuda national team and scored one goal.

International goals
Scores and results list Antigua and Barbuda's goal tally first.

References

External links
 

1985 births
Living people
Antigua and Barbuda footballers
Antigua and Barbuda international footballers
Antigua Barracuda F.C. players
USL Championship players
Association football midfielders